Ringwood is a borough in Passaic County, New Jersey, United States. As of the 2020 United States census, the borough's population was 11,735, a decline of 493 (−4.0%) from the 2010 census count of 12,228, which in turn reflected a decrease of 168 (−1.4%) from the 12,396 counted in the 2000 Census.

It is the home of Ringwood State Park which contains the New Jersey Botanical Garden at Skylands (plus Skylands Manor), the Shepherd Lake Recreation Area and historic Ringwood Manor.

The Borough of Ringwood was incorporated by an act of the New Jersey Legislature on February 23, 1918, from a "portion of the Township of Pompton", as one of three boroughs formed from Pompton Township, joining Bloomingdale and Wanaque, based on the results of a referendum held on March 22, 1918. The first organizational meeting of the Borough Council took place in the existing Borough Hall on May 6, 1918. The borough was named for an iron mining company in the area.

History

The Lenape, an Algonquian language-speaking tribe of Native Americans who occupied much of the mid-Atlantic coastal areas and the interior mountains including along the Delaware River resided in the area of present-day Ringwood when Europeans first entered the area. Some retreated to the mountains to escape colonial encroachment.

Colonists called the local band the Ramapough, and named the Ramapo River and other regional features after them. Their descendants and Afro-Dutch migrants from New York were among the people who formed the multiracial group known as the Ramapough Mountain Indians, recognized in 1980 as the "Ramapough Lenape Nation" Native American tribe by the state of New Jersey, though the federal government has denied their application for formal recognition.

Early in the 18th century, colonists discovered iron in the area. The Ogden family built a blast furnace in Ringwood in 1742. By 1765, Peter Hasenclever used Ringwood as the center of his ironmaking operations, which included  in New Jersey, New York and Nova Scotia. Iron mining was prominent in the area from the 18th century until the Great Depression, and iron shafts and pits, landfills and other elements still exist. The London, Roomy, Peters and Hope mines were all originally opened by Peter Hasenclever's London Company.

A number of well-known ironmasters owned and lived at Ringwood Manor from the 1740s to the late 19th century. During the American Revolutionary War, Robert Erskine managed ironmaking operations from Ringwood, and became George Washington's first geographer and Surveyor-General, producing maps for the Continental Army. Washington visited the Manor House several times. Ringwood iron was used in the famous Hudson River Chain, and for tools and hardware for the army. One of the Manor's last owners was Abram S. Hewitt, ironmaster, educator, lawyer, U.S. Congressman, and Mayor of New York City. The Manor is part of a National Historic Landmark District.

Geography
According to the United States Census Bureau, Ringwood had a total area of 28.49 square miles (73.8 km2), including 25.59 square miles (66.27 km2) of land and 2.91 square miles (7.52 km2) of water (10.20%).

Unincorporated communities, localities and place names located partially or completely within the borough include Brushwood Pond, Cupsaw Lake, Skyline Lake, Conklintown, Erskine, Harrison Mountain Lake, Lake Erskine, Monks, Negro Pond, Sheppard Pond, Stonetown, Upper Lake and Weyble Pond.

The borough borders Bloomingdale, Wanaque and West Milford in Passaic County; Mahwah and Oakland in Bergen County; Tuxedo and Warwick in Orange County, New York; and Ramapo in Rockland County, New York.

The town is split by the Wanaque Reservoir, which provides water to urban areas in Northeastern New Jersey.

Climate
Ringwood has a hot summer continental climate (Köppen climate classification Dfa).

Demographics

2010 census

The Census Bureau's 2006–2010 American Community Survey showed that (in 2010 inflation-adjusted dollars) median household income was $109,139 (with a margin of error of +/− $8,896) and the median family income was $117,793 (+/− $9,712). Males had a median income of $70,086 (+/− $9,303) versus $54,397 (+/− $6,682) for females. The per capita income for the borough was $39,931 (+/− $2,197). Estimates of families and population below the poverty line were not available.

Same-sex couples headed 37 households in 2010, an increase from the 26 counted in 2000.

2000 census
As of the 2000 United States census there were 12,396 people, 4,108 households, and 3,446 families residing in the borough. The population density was 491.0 people per square mile (189.5/km2). There were 4,221 housing units at an average density of 167.2 per square mile (64.5/km2). The racial makeup of the borough was 93.87% White, 1.61% African American, 1.44% Native American, 1.19% Asian, 0.01% Pacific Islander, 0.67% from other races, and 1.21% from two or more races. 4.25% of the population were Hispanic or Latino of any race.

There were 4,108 households, out of which 42.1% had children under the age of 18 living with them, 73.5% were married couples living together, 7.8% had a female householder with no husband present, and 16.1% were non-families. 12.1% of all households were made up of individuals, and 3.6% had someone living alone who was 65 years of age or older. The average household size was 3.00 and the average family size was 3.28.

In the borough the population was spread out, with 27.6% under the age of 18, 6.0% from 18 to 24, 30.7% from 25 to 44, 27.9% from 45 to 64, and 7.9% who were 65 years of age or older. The median age was 37 years. For every 100 females, there were 100.1 males. For every 100 females age 18 and over, there were 95.3 males.

The median income for a household in the borough was $81,636, and the median income for a family was $85,108. Males had a median income of $60,097 versus $36,005 for females. The per capita income for the borough was $31,341. 2.8% of the population and 2.0% of families were below the poverty line. Out of the total population, 3.9% of those under the age of 18 and 2.2% of those 65 and older were living below the poverty line.

Parks and recreation 
Ringwood State Park is a  state park located in the heart of the Ramapo Mountains. The Park consists of four distinct areas: Ringwood Manor, Skylands Manor/NJ State Botanical Garden, Shepherd Lake, and Bear Swamp Lake.

The New Weis Center is an environmental education, arts and recreation center located at 150 Snake Den Road.

Spring Lake Day Camp is an ACA-accredited summer day camp for children in Kindergarten through 10th grade. The camp was founded in 1989 and has been family owned and operated since its opening.

The Highlands Natural Pool is an Olympic size, stream-fed freshwater pool that was carved and founded in 1935 by The Nature Friends, a group of residents who enjoyed working on recreational projects for the local community.

Law and government

Local government

Ringwood operates within the Faulkner Act (formally known as the Optional Municipal Charter Law) under the Council-Manager form of municipal government Plan E, implemented based on the recommendations of a Charter Study Commission as of January 1, 1979. The borough is one of 71 municipalities (of the 564) statewide that use this form of government. The borough's governing body is comprised of a seven-member Borough Council whose members are elected at-large in partisan elections to serve four-year terms of office on a staggered basis, with either three or four seats coming up for election in odd-numbered years as part of the November general election. At an annual reorganization meeting held each January, the council selects a Mayor and a deputy mayor from among its members.

, members of the Ringwood Borough Council are Mayor Sean T. Noonan (R, term on council ends December 31, 2025; term as mayor ends 2023), Deputy Mayor Jaime Matteo-Landis (R, term on council ends 2023; term as deputy mayor also ends 2023), Stephanie N. Baumgartner (R, 2025), Stephanie A. Forest (R, 2025), Michelle Kerr (R, 2026), Linda M. Schaefer (R, 2023), and John M. Speer (R, 2023).

In January 2022, the borough council appointed Michelle Kerr to fill the seat expiring in December 2023 that had been held by Michael McCracken until he resigned from office.

Emergency services
Ringwood is serviced by a volunteer ambulance corps and three volunteer fire companies, with each fire company covering one section of the borough. The Erskine Lakes Fire Company covers Erskine Lakes, and Cupsaw Lake. Ringwood Volunteer Fire Company #1 (Stonetown) covers Stonetown. and Skyline Lake Fire Department covers Skyline Lake area.

Federal, state and county representation
Ringwood is located in the 5th Congressional District and is part of New Jersey's 39th state legislative district. Prior to the 2011 reapportionment following the 2010 Census, Ringwood had been in the 40th state legislative district.

 

Passaic County is governed by Board of County Commissioners, comprised of seven members who are elected at-large to staggered three-year terms office on a partisan basis, with two or three seats coming up for election each year as part of the November general election in a three-year cycle. At a reorganization meeting held in January, the board selects a Director and Deputy Director from among its members to serve for a one-year term. 
, Passaic County's Commissioners are 
Director Bruce James (D, Clifton, term as commissioner ends December 31, 2023; term as director ends 2022),
Deputy Director Cassandra "Sandi" Lazzara (D, Little Falls, term as commissioner ends 2024; term as deputy director ends 2022),
John W. Bartlett (D, Wayne, 2024),
Theodore O. "T.J." Best Jr. (D, Paterson, 2023),
Terry Duffy (D, West Milford, 2022),
Nicolino Gallo (R, Totowa, 2024) and 
Pasquale "Pat" Lepore (D, Woodland Park, 2022).
Constitutional officers, elected on a countywide basis are
County Clerk Danielle Ireland-Imhof (D, Hawthorne, 2023),
Sheriff Richard H. Berdnik (D, Clifton, 2022) and 
Surrogate Zoila S. Cassanova (D, Wayne, 2026).

Politics
As of March 23, 2011, there were a total of 8,676 registered voters in Ringwood, of which 1,733 (20.0% vs. 31.0% countywide) were registered as Democrats, 2,714 (31.3% vs. 18.7%) were registered as Republicans and 4,225 (48.7% vs. 50.3%) were registered as Unaffiliated. There were 4 voters registered as Libertarians or Greens. Among the borough's 2010 Census population, 71.0% (vs. 53.2% in Passaic County) were registered to vote, including 94.3% of those ages 18 and over (vs. 70.8% countywide).

In the 2012 presidential election, Republican Mitt Romney received 53.9% of the vote (3,411 cast), ahead of Democrat Barack Obama with 45.0% (2,845 votes), and other candidates with 1.1% (68 votes), among the 6,359 ballots cast by the borough's 8,936 registered voters (35 ballots were spoiled), for a turnout of 71.2%. In the 2008 presidential election, Republican John McCain received 3,667 votes (52.5% vs. 37.7% countywide), ahead of Democrat Barack Obama with 3,146 votes (45.0% vs. 58.8%) and other candidates with 68 votes (1.0% vs. 0.8%), among the 6,985 ballots cast by the borough's 8,922 registered voters, for a turnout of 78.3% (vs. 70.4% in Passaic County). In the 2004 presidential election, Republican George W. Bush received 3,636 votes (54.7% vs. 42.7% countywide), ahead of Democrat John Kerry with 2,897 votes (43.6% vs. 53.9%) and other candidates with 46 votes (0.7% vs. 0.7%), among the 6,647 ballots cast by the borough's 8,372 registered voters, for a turnout of 79.4% (vs. 69.3% in the whole county).

In the 2013 gubernatorial election, Republican Chris Christie received 64.8% of the vote (2,531 cast), ahead of Democrat Barbara Buono with 33.6% (1,313 votes), and other candidates with 1.6% (61 votes), among the 3,957 ballots cast by the borough's 9,014 registered voters (52 ballots were spoiled), for a turnout of 43.9%. In the 2009 gubernatorial election, Republican Chris Christie received 2,573 votes (55.9% vs. 43.2% countywide), ahead of Democrat Jon Corzine with 1,714 votes (37.2% vs. 50.8%), Independent Chris Daggett with 236 votes (5.1% vs. 3.8%) and other candidates with 50 votes (1.1% vs. 0.9%), among the 4,606 ballots cast by the borough's 8,696 registered voters, yielding a 53.0% turnout (vs. 42.7% in the county).

Education
Students in kindergarten through eighth grade are served by the Ringwood Public School District. As of the 2020–21 school year, the district, comprised of four schools, had an enrollment of 1,045 students and 103.9 classroom teachers (on an FTE basis), for a student–teacher ratio of 10.1:1. Schools in the district (with 2020–21 enrollment data from the National Center for Education Statistics) are 
Peter Cooper Elementary School with 228 students in grades K–3 (built in 1963), 
Robert Erskine Elementary School with 185 students in grades K–3 (built in 1960), 
Eleanor G. Hewitt Intermediate School with 246 students in grades 4–5 (built in 1937 with an annex built in 1952 and trailers added in 1959) and 
Martin J. Ryerson Middle School with 389 students in grades 6–8 (built in 1970).

Ringwood's public schools are supported in part with grants from the Ringwood Educational Foundation, a not-for-profit organization which sponsors, among other things, the annual Shepherd Lake 5K run.

Students in public school for ninth through twelfth grades attend Lakeland Regional High School in Wanaque, which serves students from the Boroughs of Ringwood and Wanaque. As of the 2020–21 school year, the high school had an enrollment of 924 students and 81.7 classroom teachers (on an FTE basis), for a student–teacher ratio of 11.3:1.

Private schools used to include Ringwood Christian School, which was founded in 1973 through the Ringwood Baptist Church, serves 80 students in kindergarten through eighth grade, with part-time sessions available for pre-schoolers. St. Catherine of Bologna School, a regional Roman Catholic parochial school operating under the supervision of the Roman Catholic Diocese of Paterson that served kindergarten through eighth grade, closed in 2018 due to falling enrollment.

Community
Ringwood residents may be eligible to join one of several private lake communities, based on where they live: assorted lakes in Stonetown, Cupsaw Lake, Erskine Lakes or Skyline Lakes, each of which have annual fees and initiation fees.

Each year on the third Saturday in March, Ringwood holds its annual St. Patrick's Day Parade, the only such parade in Passaic County. Since 1990, the Parade Committee selects a grand marshal and a Citizen of the Year.  These chosen outstanding citizens of the community are honored at a Unity Breakfast that precedes the parade.  The parade includes bagpipe bands, floats, Irish step dancers, the county sheriff's department with their equestrian unit, local police, and fire and ambulance departments. Other marchers include Girl Scout and Boy Scout troops, local school groups and other recreational teams. The parade ends at the St. Catherine of Bologna Church Parish Center, where the celebration continues with live music and entertainment.

Transportation

Roads and highways

There are no state, U.S., or Interstate highways in Ringwood. The most prominent roads are County Route 511, which follows the Greenwood Lake Turnpike, and County Route 692, which follows Skyline Drive. The nearest major highway is Interstate 287, and both CR 511 and CR 692 have interchanges with it in neighboring Wanaque and Oakland, respectively. Ringwood had no traffic lights until June 2013, when the town's first one was installed at the intersection of Skyline Drive and Erskine Road. The borough still has no sidewalks or street lights.

Public transportation
NJ Transit bus transportation is available at the Ringwood Park and Ride, located adjacent to Ringwood Public Library. The 196 offers express bus service to and from the Port Authority Bus Terminal in Midtown Manhattan, while the 197 route offers local service, including to the Willowbrook Mall and Willowbrook Park and Ride.

Notable people

People who were born in, residents of, or otherwise closely associated with Ringwood include:

 Robert Erskine (1735–1780), a Scottish inventor and later an American officer in the Continental Army during the American Revolutionary War
 Carol Habben (1933–1997), center fielder and backup catcher who played in the All-American Girls Professional Baseball League
 Jeff Livesey (born 1966). former professional baseball player and current coach in the Miami Marlins organization
 Wayne Mann, leader of the Ramapough Mountain Indians and lead participant of 600-person mass tort suit against Ford Motor Company for environmental contamination of the Ringwood Mines landfill site
 George Martin (born 1953), former defensive end for the New York Giants
 Sarah Pagano (born 1991), long-distance runner
 John Dyneley Prince (1868–1945), linguist, diplomat, and politician who was a professor at New York University and Columbia University, minister to Denmark and Yugoslavia, and leader of both houses of the New Jersey Legislature
 Kim Rosen (born ), audio mastering engineer
 Eric Schubert (born 1962), former American football placekicker who played in the NFL for the New York Giants, St. Louis Cardinals and New England Patriots
 Darren Soto (born 1978), member of the Florida House, then the Florida Senate and Congressman from Orlando, Florida
 Francis Lynde Stetson (1846–1920), lawyer and designer of the Botanical Gardens at Skylands Manor

References

External links

Borough data
 Ringwood Borough website
 Ringwood Chamber of Commerce
 Ringwood Public Schools
 Lakeland Regional High School
 
 School Data for the Ringwood Public Schools, National Center for Education Statistics
 Ringwood Fire Company #1
 Ringwood Public Library

Borough history
 Ringwood Manor History
 Ringwood Manor Association of the Arts
 Peters Mine from Ringwood.  Slide show and rare shots of the mining operation, courtesy www.ironminers.com
 Plein Air Painters of the New Jersey Highlands
 Historical Mines of Ringwood New Jersey
 Abandoned mines of Ringwood & the NJ Highlands.

Borough organizations
 Highlands Natural Pool, Community swimming pool.
 Skyline Lake Volunteer Fire Department, Ringwood New Jersey
 Ringwood Ambulance Corps
 Skyline Lakes Property Owners Association-SPLOA
 Ringwood Boro Volunteer Fire Company #1 - Stonetown
 Skyline Lake Fire Department
 Erskine Lakes Volunteer Fire Company #1
 Snake Den Road, Local community web site.
 Cupsaw Lake Improvement Association
 Erksine Lakes Property Owners Association
 Skyline Lakes Property Owners Association
 Cub Scout Pack 96
 Cub Scout Pack 140
 Boy Scout Troop 76
 Erskine Lakes Aquatic Club
 Ringwood Farmers' Market

 
1918 establishments in New Jersey
Boroughs in Passaic County, New Jersey
Faulkner Act (council–manager)
Mines in New Jersey
Populated places established in 1918